Lychnuchus is a genus of skipper butterflies in the family Hesperiidae.

Species
Lychnuchus achelous Plötz, 1882 - ferruginous brown-eye

Lychnuchus angularis Möschler, 1877
Lychnuchus aphilos Herrich-Schäffer, 1869
Lychnuchus blenda Evans, 1955
Lychnuchus blotta Evans, 1955
Lychnuchus celsus (Fabricius, 1793)
Lychnuchus demon (Evans, 1955)
Lychnuchus dognini Mabille, 1889
Lychnuchus iccius Evans, 1955
Lychnuchus immaculata Hewitson, 1868 - immaculate brown-eye 
Lychnuchus topo Nicolay, 1980
Lychnuchus uza Hewitson, 1877

Former species
Lychnuchus olenus Hübner, [1831] - synonymized with Hesperia celsus Fabricius, 1793
Lychnuchus pelta Evans, 1955 - transferred to Molo pelta (Evans, 1955)
Lychnuchus victa Evans, 1955 - transferred to Alychna victa (Evans, 1955)

References

Natural History Museum Lepidoptera genus database

Hesperiinae
Hesperiidae genera